

The Albatros C.XV was a German military reconnaissance aircraft developed during World War I. It was essentially a refinement of the C.XII, which had been put into production in 1918. The war ended before any examples became operational.  However, some found their way into civilian hands and flew as transport aircraft in peacetime under the factory designation L 47. Others saw service with the air forces of Russia, Turkey, and Latvia.

Operators

Luftstreitkräfte

Latvian Air Force

Lithuanian Air Force

Polish Air Force (postwar)

Soviet Air Force

Turkish Air Force
 Albania
 Royal Albanian Air Corps

Specifications (C.XV)

References

 
 luftfahrt-archiv.de

Biplanes
Single-engined tractor aircraft
1910s German military reconnaissance aircraft
C.15
Aircraft first flown in 1918